An indirect presidential election was held in the Marshall Islands on 3 January 2012 following the 2011 general election.

Result
Only two candidates were nominated for President, who is elected by the 33-member Nitijela. The candidates were the incumbent President Jurelang Zedkaia, and long-time MP and government minister Christopher Loeak. Loeak won the election with 21 votes to 11 votes. Loeak was expected to name his cabinet and be sworn in within a week.

Reaction
Zedkaia has agreed to co-operate with the new administration.

References

2012 elections in Oceania
Presidential election
2012
January 2012 events in Oceania